Norway Speedway, located in Norway, Michigan, is a one-third mile asphalt oval track that is slightly banked. Norway Speedway began as a dirt track in 1942 and was paved in 1978. The track held American Speed Association sanction before the sanctioning body closed. The track holds stock car races on Friday nights from mid-May through Labor Day Weekend which is the weekend of the Dickinson County Fair. The fair has games, carnival rides, a demolition derby, and a livestock building filled with animals. Events include the Auto-Value Challenge Series, Race to a Cure Cancer, the Stateline Challenge and the Labor Day 100 championship race held during the Dickinson County Fair. The ARCA Midwest Tour, Mid-American Stock Car Series, and the TUNDRA Super Late Models have raced at the track.
  
The speedway has five divisions:
 Late Models
 Sportsman
 Super Stocks
 Stock 4 cylinders
 Wisconsin Sport Trucks (bi-weekly)

The speedway is located at the Dickinson County fairgrounds along U.S. Route 8.

Images

References

External links

Official website

Buildings and structures in Dickinson County, Michigan
Event venues established in 1942
Motorsport venues in Michigan
1942 establishments in Michigan